Sclerogenia is a genus of moths of the family Noctuidae.

Species
 Sclerogenia jessica Butler, 1878

References
 Natural History Museum Lepidoptera genus database
 Sclerogenia at funet.fi

Plusiinae